Emmalocera haploschema is a species of snout moth in the genus Emmalocera. It is found in Queensland, Australia.

References

Moths described in 1904
Emmalocera